Abdullah Musa Abdullah (born 2 March 1958) is a footballer from the UAE who played as a goalkeeper for Al-Ahli Club in Dubai, and the UAE national football team. He was in the squad of UAE team in the 1990 FIFA World Cup in Italy but never played in the tournament.

References

1958 births
Living people
Sportspeople from Dubai
Emirati footballers
Al Ahli Club (Dubai) players
1984 AFC Asian Cup players
1990 FIFA World Cup players
United Arab Emirates international footballers
UAE Pro League players
Association football goalkeepers